When All You've Ever Wanted Isn't Enough: The Search for a Life That Matters is a 1986 book by Harold Kushner, a Conservative rabbi.  Kushner addresses in the book matters of existentialism, particularly the Meaning of life and the individual pursuit of happiness. Kushner makes several references to the book of Ecclesiastes as a point of reassurance, also Goethe's Faust and works by Carl Jung.

References

1986 non-fiction books
Religious literature
Summit Books books